The Kuala Linggi Mangrove Recreational Forest is a mangrove forest located in Kuala Sungai Baru, Alor Gajah District, Malacca, Malaysia.

See also
 Geography of Malaysia
 List of tourist attractions in Malacca

References

Forests of Malaysia
Tourist attractions in Malacca